In group theory, a branch of abstract algebra, a character table is a two-dimensional table whose rows correspond to irreducible representations, and whose columns correspond to conjugacy classes of group elements.  The entries consist of characters, the traces of the matrices representing group elements of the column's class in the given row's group representation. In chemistry, crystallography, and spectroscopy, character tables of point groups are used to classify e.g. molecular vibrations according to their symmetry, and to predict whether a transition between two states is forbidden for symmetry reasons. Many university level textbooks on physical chemistry, quantum chemistry, spectroscopy and inorganic chemistry devote a chapter to the use of symmetry group character tables.

Definition and example
The irreducible complex characters of a finite group form a character table which encodes much useful information about the group G in a compact form. Each row is labelled by an irreducible character and the entries in the row are the values of that character on any representative of the respective conjugacy class of G (because characters are class functions). Each entry in the first row is therefore 1. Similarly, it is customary to label the first column by the identity. The entries of the first column are the values of the irreducible characters at the identity, the degrees of the irreducible characters. Characters of degree 1 are known as linear characters.

Here is the character table of C3 = <u>, the cyclic group with three elements and generator u:

where ω is a primitive third root of unity. The character table for general cyclic groups is (a scalar multiple of) the DFT matrix.

Another example is the character table of :

where (12) represents conjugacy class consisting of (12),(13),(23), and (123) represents conjugacy class consisting of (123),(132). To learn more about character table of symmetric groups, see .

The first row of the character table always consists of 1s, and corresponds to the trivial representation (the 1-dimensional representation consisting of 1×1 matrices containing the entry 1). Further, the character table is always square because (1) irreducible characters are pairwise orthogonal, and (2) no other non-trivial class function is orthogonal to every character. (A class function is one that is constant on conjugacy classes.) This is tied to the important fact that the irreducible representations of a finite group G are in bijection with its conjugacy classes.  This bijection also follows by showing that the class sums form a basis for the center of the group algebra of G, which has dimension equal to the number of irreducible representations of G.

Orthogonality relations

The space of complex-valued class functions of a finite group G has a natural inner-product:

With respect to this inner product, the irreducible characters form an orthonormal basis
for the space of class-functions, and this yields the orthogonality relation for the rows of the character
table:

For  the orthogonality relation for columns is as follows:

For an arbitrary character , it is irreducible if and only if .

The orthogonality relations can aid many computations including:
 Decomposing an unknown character as a linear combination of irreducible characters, i.e. # of copies of irreducible representation Vi in V = .
 Constructing the complete character table when only some of the irreducible characters are known.
 Finding the orders of the centralizers of representatives of the conjugacy classes of a group.
 Finding the order of the group, for any g in G.

If the irreducible representation V is non-trivial, then .

More specifically, consider the regular representation which is the permutation obtained from a finite group G acting on itself. Then given an irreducible representation ,

.

Then decomposing the regular representations as a sum of irreducible representations of G, we get . From which we conclude

over all irreducible representations . This sum can help narrow down the dimensions of the irreducible representations in a character table.

Properties
Complex conjugation acts on the character table: since the complex conjugate of a representation is again a representation, the same is true for characters, and thus a character that takes on non-trivial complex values has a conjugate character.

Certain properties of the group G can be deduced from its character table:

 The order of G is given by the sum of the squares of the entries of the first column (the degrees of the irreducible characters). (See Representation theory of finite groups#Applying Schur's lemma.) More generally, the sum of the squares of the absolute values of the entries in any column gives the order of the centralizer of an element of the corresponding conjugacy class.
All normal subgroups of G (and thus whether or not G is simple) can be recognised from its character table. The kernel of a character χ is the set of elements g in G for which χ(g) = χ(1); this is a normal subgroup of G. Each normal subgroup of G is the intersection of the kernels of some of the irreducible characters of G. 
The number of irreducible representations of G equals the number of conjugacy classes that G has.
It follows, using some results of Richard Brauer from modular representation theory, that the prime divisors of the orders of the elements of each conjugacy class of a finite group can be deduced from its character table (an observation of Graham Higman).

The character table does not in general determine the group up to isomorphism: for example, the quaternion group Q and the dihedral group of 8 elements (D4) have the same character table. Brauer asked whether the character table, together with the knowledge of how the powers of elements of its conjugacy classes are distributed, determines a finite group up to isomorphism. In 1964, this was answered in the negative by E. C. Dade.

This gives rise to a group of linear characters, called the character group under the operation . This group is connected to Dirichlet characters and Fourier analysis.

Outer automorphisms 
The outer automorphism group acts on the character table by permuting columns (conjugacy classes) and accordingly rows, which gives another symmetry to the table. For example, abelian groups have the outer automorphism , which is non-trivial except for elementary abelian 2-groups, and outer because abelian groups are precisely those for which conjugation (inner automorphisms) acts trivially. Note that this particular automorphism (negative in abelian groups) agrees with complex conjugation.

If  is an inner automorphism (conjugation by some element a), then it acts trivially on representations, because representations are class functions (conjugation does not change their value). Thus a given class of outer automorphisms, it acts on the characters – because inner automorphisms act trivially, the action of the automorphism group Aut descends to the quotient Out.

This relation can be used both ways: given an outer automorphism, one can produce new representations (if the representation is not equal on conjugacy classes that are interchanged by the outer automorphism), and conversely, one can restrict possible outer automorphisms based on the character table.

Finding the vibrational modes of water molecule using character table 
To find the total number of vibrational modes of water molecule, the irreducible representation  needs to calculate from the character table of water molecule first.

Finding Γreducible from the Character Table of H2O molecule 
Water (H2O) molecule falls under the point group . Below is the character table of  point group, which is also the character table for water molecule. 

In here, the first row describes the possible symmetry operations of this point group and the first column represents the Mulliken symbols. The fifth and sixth columns are functions of the axis variables. 

Functions:

When determining the characters for a representation, assign  if it remains unchanged,  if it moved, and  if it reversed its direction. A simple way to determine the characters for the reducible representation , is to multiply the number of unshifted atom(s) with 'contribution per atom'''  along each of three axis when a symmetry operation is carried out. 

Unless otherwise stated, for the identity operation , 'contribution per unshifted atom' for each atom is always , as none of the atom(s) change their position during this operation. For any reflective symmetry operation , 'contribution per atom' is always , as for any reflection, an atom remains unchanged along with two axis and reverse its direction along with the other axis. For the inverse symmetry operation , 'contribution per unshifted atom' is always , as each of three axis of an atom reverse its direction during this operation.

Where, 

Calculating the irreducible representation Γirreducible from the reducible representation Γreducible along with the character table 
From the above discussion, a new character table for water molecule ( point group) can be written as

Using the new character table including , the reducible representation for all motion of the H2O molecule can be reduced using below formula

 

where, 

 order of the group, 

 character from the reducible representation for a particular class, 

 the number of operations in the class

So,

So, the reduced representation for all motions of water molecule will be

Translational motion for water molecule 
Translational motion will corresponds with the reducible representations in the character table, which have ,  and  function

Rotational motion for water molecule 
Rotational motion will corresponds with the reducible representations in the character table, which have ,  and  function

Total vibrational modes for water molecule 
Total vibrational mode, 

So, total  vibrational modes are possible for water molecules and two of them are symmetric vibrational modes (as ) and the other vibrational mode is antisymmetric (as )

Checking whether the water molecule is IR active or Raman active 
There is some rules to be IR active or Raman active for a particular mode. 

Similar rules will apply for rest of the irreducible representations

See also

Molecular symmetry
 List of character tables for chemically important 3D point groups
 Character tables of small groups on GroupNames

References

Group theory
Representation theory